Savaran may refer to:

Geography 
Savaran, Isfahan
Savaran, South Khorasan
Kani Savaran, Kurdistan Province
Pir Savaran, Hamadan Province
Kuh-e Haft Savaran, Ostan-e Lorestan, 33.57 N, 49.96 E
Ziaratgah-e Shah Savaran, Sistan and Baluchestan Province, 30.06 N, 60.77 E
Shahsavaran
Kuh-e Shahsavaran  28.76 N 60.86 E

Military 
 Asvārān, also known as "Savārān", historical Persian military units.

See also
Shahsavar (disambiguation)
Saravan (disambiguation)